Holway is a housing estate in Flintshire, Wales. It is to the east of Carmel and to the north of the North Wales expressway.

History 
Holway has had problems with anti-social behaviour.

References 

Villages in Flintshire